Ongandjera (from "aagandji yiiyela", place of gold metal thread beads) is settlement near Okahao in the Omusati Region in northern Namibia. Historically part of Ovamboland, Ongandjera is  also a traditional kingship. In 1917, South Africa stripped the rulers of seven kingships, including Ongandjera, of their authority. Following Namibia's independence, the king of Ongandjera declared the royal family restored. 
Ongandjera is the birthplace of Sam Nujoma, the country's first president,
and of Pendukeni Iivula-Ithana who was the secretary-general of SWAPO from 2007-2012.

References

Populated places in the Omusati Region
Ovambo